Kathryn Donovan (born January 29, 1982) is an American professional racing cyclist who rides for Colavita/Bianchi.

See also
 List of 2016 UCI Women's Teams and riders

References

External links
 

1982 births
Living people
American female cyclists
Place of birth missing (living people)
21st-century American women